George Ernest Banks (28 March 1919 – 1991) was an English professional footballer who played in the Football League for Mansfield Town and West Bromwich Albion.

References

1919 births
1991 deaths
English footballers
Association football defenders
English Football League players
West Bromwich Albion F.C. players
Mansfield Town F.C. players
Hereford United F.C. players
Dudley Town F.C. players
Darlaston Town F.C. players